The Angoni vlei rat (Otomys angoniensis) is a species of rodent in the family Muridae.
It is found in Botswana, Kenya, Malawi, Mozambique, South Africa, Eswatini, Tanzania, Zambia, and Zimbabwe.

Its natural habitats are moist savanna, temperate grassland, subtropical or tropical seasonally wet or flooded lowland grassland, swamps, and pastureland. It is not considered threatened by the IUCN.

References

Otomys
Mammals described in 1906
Taxonomy articles created by Polbot